Red Buttons (born Aaron Chwatt; February 5, 1919 – July 13, 2006) was an American actor and comedian. He won an Oscar and a Golden Globe for his supporting role in the 1957 film Sayonara.  He was nominated for awards for his acting work in films such as They Shoot Horses, Don't They?, Harlow, and Pete's Dragon.  Buttons played  the lead role of Private John Steele, the paratrooper hung up on the town steeple clock, in the 1962 international ensemble cast film The Longest Day.

Early life
Red Buttons was born Aaron Chwatt on February 5, 1919, in Manhattan, New York City, to Jewish immigrants Sophie (née Baker) and Michael Chwatt. At 16 years old, Chwatt got a job as an entertaining bellhop at Ryan's Tavern in City Island, the Bronx, New York City. The combination of his red hair and the large, shiny buttons on the bellhop uniforms inspired orchestra leader Charles "Dinty" Moore to call him "Red Buttons", the name under which he would later perform.

Later that same summer, Buttons worked on the Borscht Belt; his straight man was Robert Alda. Buttons was working at the Irvington Hotel in South Fallsburg, New York, when the master of ceremonies became incapacitated, and Buttons asked for the chance to replace him. In 1939, Buttons started working for Minsky's Burlesque; in 1941, José Ferrer chose Buttons to appear in a Broadway show The Admiral Had a Wife, a farce, set in Pearl Harbor at Oahu, Hawaii. It was due to open on December 8, 1941, but never did, as it was deemed inappropriate after the Japanese attack on Pearl Harbor. In later years, Buttons would joke that the Japanese only attacked Pearl Harbor to keep him off Broadway.

Career
In September 1942, Buttons made his Broadway debut in Vickie with Ferrer and Uta Hagen. Later that year, he appeared in the Minsky's show Wine, Women and Song. This was the last classic burlesque show in New York City history, as the Mayor La Guardia administration closed it down. Buttons was on stage when the show was raided.

Drafted into the United States Army Air Forces, Buttons in 1943 appeared in the Army Air Forces' Broadway show Winged Victory, along with several future stars, including Mario Lanza, John Forsythe, Karl Malden, and Lee J. Cobb. A year later, he appeared in Darryl F. Zanuck's movie version of the play, directed by George Cukor. Buttons also entertained troops in the European Theater in the same Jeep Show unit as Mickey Rooney.

After the war, Buttons continued to perform in Broadway shows. He also performed at Broadway movie houses with big bands. In 1952, Buttons received his own variety series on television, The Red Buttons Show, which ran for three years on CBS.  It was the number-11 show in prime time in 1952. In 1953, he recorded and had a two-sided hit with "Strange Things Are Happening"/"The Ho Ho Song", with both sides/songs essentially being the same.

His role in Sayonara was a dramatic departure from his previous work. In this film, co-starring with Marlon Brando, he played Joe Kelly, an American airman stationed in Kobe, Japan, during the Korean War, who marries Katsumi, a Japanese woman (played by Miyoshi Umeki), but he is barred from taking her back to the US. His moving portrayal of Kelly's calm resolve not to abandon the relationship, and the touching reassurance of Katsumi, impressed audiences and critics alike.  Buttons won the Academy Award for Best Supporting Actor and Umeki won the Academy Award for Best Supporting Actress for the film.

After his Oscar-winning role, Buttons performed in numerous feature films, including the African adventure Hatari! with John Wayne, the adventure Five Weeks in a Balloon (1962) (where he received top billing), the war epic The Longest Day, the biopic Harlow, the disaster film The Poseidon Adventure, the dance-marathon drama They Shoot Horses, Don't They?, the family comedy Pete's Dragon, the disaster film When Time Ran Out with Paul Newman, and the age-reversal comedy 18 Again! with George Burns.

In 1966, Buttons again starred in his own TV series, a spy spoof called The Double Life of Henry Phyfe, which ran for one season. Buttons also made guest appearances on several TV programs, including The Eleventh Hour, Little House on the Prairie, It's Garry Shandling's Show, Knots Landing, and Roseanne. His last TV role was in ER.

He became a nationally recognizable comedian, and his "Never Got a Dinner" routine was a standard of The Dean Martin Celebrity Roast for many years. He made numerous appearances at Friars Club roasts and Chabad telethons, where he was often brought on and off stage to the tune of "Hava Nagila". (He once told an interviewer, "I'm a Jew who is doing comedy, not a 'Jewish comic'.")

His best-known catchphrase, "Never got a dinner!" formed the basis for elaborately eccentric lists of famous people (and their mothers) who had not been honored with celebrity dinner roasts. Another of his catchphrases was "I did not come here to be made sport of," which was later taken up by radio talk-show host Howie Carr.

Buttons received a star on the Hollywood Walk of Fame for television, located at 1651 Vine Street. He was number 71 on Comedy Central's list of the 100 Greatest Stand-Ups of All Time.

Personal life
Buttons married actress Roxanne Arlen in 1947, but the marriage soon ended in divorce. He married Helayne McNorton on December 8, 1949.  They divorced in 1963. His last marriage was to Alicia Prats, which lasted from January 27, 1964, until her death in March 2001. With Prats he had two children, Amy Buttons and Adam Buttons. He was the advertising spokesman for Century Village, Florida, a retirement community.

Buttons was an early member of the Synagogue for the Performing Arts, and at the time Rabbi Jerome Cutler was the rabbi.

Death
Buttons died of complications from cardiovascular disease on July 13, 2006, at age 87 at his home in Century City, Los Angeles.  He had been ill for a while and was with family members when he died. His ashes were given to his family after cremation.

Filmography

Film

Television

Accolades and honors 
Throughout his career, Buttons received several awards and nominations for his work in both film and television.

References

External links

 Interview with Red Buttons' Television Writer, August 2012
 
 
 
 
 , video, 4 minutes

1919 births
2006 deaths
20th-century American comedians
20th-century American male actors
21st-century American comedians
20th-century American male singers
20th-century American singers
20th-century American Jews
21st-century American Jews
Jewish American comedians
American male comedians
American male film actors
American male musical theatre actors
American male stage actors
American male television actors
United States Army Air Forces personnel of World War II
Best Supporting Actor Academy Award winners
Best Supporting Actor Golden Globe (film) winners
Comedians from New York City
Male actors from New York City
Jewish American male actors
People from Manhattan
United States Army Air Forces soldiers
Vaudeville performers